Gallant Man (March 20, 1954 – September 7, 1988) was a thoroughbred racehorse, named for a horse in a Don Ameche movie. He was one of the most successful racehorses foaled outside the United States with his near miss in the 1957 Kentucky Derby and his record 1957 Belmont Stakes win. His exact foaling date was unknown or at best debated over the years of his life and many years after. The supporting evidence from a review of foaling stall records in Ireland indicates that he was born on the Saturday after St. Patrick's Day during a highly productive foaling weekend for many thoroughbred mothers on the same farm. His dam, Majideh, is recorded as being in the foaling stall without a live foal until March 20, 1954, at approximately 7:45 am.

Racing career

Performance at Kentucky Derby
Gallant Man is remembered primarily for his upset loss in the 1957 Kentucky Derby. He would almost certainly have won the race, but his jockey, Hall of Famer Bill Shoemaker, misjudged the finish line and stood up too early in his stirrups, which slowed Gallant Man's rush for the wire and allowed another Hall of Fame jockey, Bill Hartack riding Iron Liege, to take the win by a nose. As noted in books, in articles, and on online sites, Shoemaker's error remains one of the biggest blunders in racing history.

Career after the Derby
After the Derby, Hall of Fame trainer John Nerud sent Gallant Man out to decimate the field in the Belmont Stakes, winning by 8 lengths, beating the favorite Bold Ruler.  The track and race records Gallant Man achieved that day stood until Bold Ruler's son, Secretariat's 1973 Belmont Stakes. Subsequently, Gallant Man beat Bold Ruler in the Metropolitan Mile, and  his Jockey Club Gold Cup was achieved against older horses.

Gallant Man raced as a three- and four-year-old at the same time as Bold Ruler and Round Table, who both became Horse of the Year.

Gallant Man, who had at one time or another beaten each of them, was never awarded a racing honor or a championship of any kind. He ranks #36 in Blood-Horse magazine List of the Top 100 U.S. Racehorses of the 20th Century.  (Round Table ranks #17 and Bold Ruler ranks #19.)

A small brown horse by (Prix de l'Arc de Triomphe winner) Migoli out of Majideh (winner of both the Irish Oaks and the Irish 1,000 Guineas), Gallant Man stood a little over fifteen hands and was afflicted with bad ankles.

If Ralph Lowe had listened to his vet, Gallant Man would not have been bought in the group of nine horses acquired from the Aga Khan ($220,000 for the crop of Irish yearlings).  However, Lowe's bloodstock agent, Humphrey Finney, thought the little horse might be perhaps the worst of the lot, but was still a good buy.

Retirement
Retired after his 1958 season with a splint problem in his left foreleg, Gallant Man stood at Kentucky's Spendthrift Farm, where he sired 52 stakes winners. He did even better as a broodmare sire.  Genuine Risk (from one of his daughters) and Gallant Bloom were two of his breeding triumphs.

Death
After being pensioned in 1981, Gallant Man was euthanized on September 7, 1988, at the age of 34 after a losing battle with lameness, respiratory problems, and many failing organs. When Gallant Man passed, John Nerud said, "When he was sound and good, a horse never lived who could beat him ... he had it all—speed and endurance."

Longevity
According to the most up-to-date records on past racehorses, Gallant Man (by virtue of his 1957 Belmont Stakes win), at 34 years and 171 days, is the longest-lived racehorse ever to win any Triple Crown race, surpassing Count Fleet, who lived for 33 years and 254 days, on November 30, 1987. His longevity genes continued throughout the generations. Nearly 20 years to the day of his death, his granddaughter Genuine Risk, who lived  years, died naturally from similar health problems, but also became the longest-lived filly ever to win a Triple Crown race. His grandson Lord Avie became one of the few thoroughbred racehorses to place third or better in all of his races and is the longest-lived horse with this distinction. In 2012, Lord Avie at 34 surpassed his grandfather in longevity by approximately  months.

External links
 Gallant Man's pedigree with photo

1954 racehorse births
1988 racehorse deaths
Racehorses trained in the United States
Racehorses bred in the United Kingdom
Belmont Stakes winners
United States Thoroughbred Racing Hall of Fame inductees
United States Champion Thoroughbred Sires
Thoroughbred family 5-e
Chefs-de-Race